Gjorgji Mojsov  (Macedonian: Ѓopѓи Mojcoв, born 27 May 1985 in Kavadarci) is a professional football coach and former player. Currently he is an assistant coach at Tikvesh in the Macedonian first division.

Club career
He has previously played with Macedonian clubs FK Pelister, FK Vardar and FK Rabotnički, Romanian Oțelul Galați, Hungarian Győri ETO FC and Serbian FK Metalac Gornji Milanovac.

Personal life
He is the older brother of Macedonian international defender Daniel Mojsov.

References

External links

 Gjorgji Mojsov at football-lineups.com
 Gjorgji Mojsov Stats at Utakmica.rs

1985 births
Living people
Sportspeople from Kavadarci
Serbian people of Macedonian descent
Association football midfielders
Macedonian footballers
North Macedonia youth international footballers
FK Pelister players
FK Vardar players
FK Rabotnički players
ASC Oțelul Galați players
Győri ETO FC players
FK Metalac Gornji Milanovac players
FK Horizont Turnovo players
FK Renova players
FC Zhetysu players
FK Sileks players
FK Tikvesh players
Macedonian First Football League players
Liga I players
Serbian SuperLiga players
Kazakhstan Premier League players
Macedonian expatriate footballers
Expatriate footballers in Romania
Macedonian expatriate sportspeople in Romania
Expatriate footballers in Hungary
Macedonian expatriate sportspeople in Hungary
Expatriate footballers in Serbia
Macedonian expatriate sportspeople in Serbia
Expatriate footballers in Kazakhstan
Macedonian expatriate sportspeople in Kazakhstan